Eassie is a village located along the A94 road in Angus, Scotland. The church in Eassie is dedicated to Saint Fergus, a monk who worked at nearby Glamis. Eassie is noted for the presence of the Eassie Stone, a carved Pictish stone, which resides in the ruins of Eassie Old Church.
Other notable prehistorical or historical features in this region include Dunnottar Castle, Fasque House, Glamis Castle, Monboddo House, Muchalls Castle, Raedykes, Stone of Morphie and Stracathro.

Famous residents
Prof James Miller (1812–1864) was born in the manse in Eassie and raised in the village.

See also
List of places in Angus
Ark Hill
Castleton
Drumtochty Forest

References

Villages in Angus, Scotland